Gordon Campbell Watkins (June 19, 1907 - April 8, 1974) was a professional American football player who played offensive lineman for two seasons for the Minneapolis Red Jackets, Frankford Yellow Jackets, and Brooklyn Dodgers.

References

1907 births
American football offensive linemen
Brooklyn Dodgers (NFL) players
Frankford Yellow Jackets players
Minneapolis Red Jackets players
Georgia Tech Yellow Jackets football players
1974 deaths